is the 19th and final single by Japanese music trio Candies. Written by Ran Itō and Shigeki Watanabe, the single was released on November 21, 1978, seven months after the trio's disbandment.

The song peaked at No. 16 on Oricon's singles chart and sold over 109,000 copies.

Track listing

Chart positions

References

External links 
 

1978 singles
1978 songs
Japanese-language songs
Candies (group) songs
Sony Music Entertainment Japan singles